Weitkamp Observatory is an astronomical observatory owned and operated by Otterbein College.  Donated in 1955 by Alfred Henry Weitkamp in memory of Mary Geeding Weitkamp, it is located in Westerville,  Ohio (USA).

See also 
List of observatories

References

External links
Otterbein University Home > Academics > Departments > Physics > Facilities - Weitkamp Observatory
Otterbein University campus map - in the text on the Facilities page linked above the location of the observatory is given as being "on the fifth floor of the McFadden-Schear science building at Otterbein University, 155 W. Main St., Westerville, Ohio (building 37 on the campus map)"; on the campus map this location is in fact shown as building 47, the Shear-McFadden Science Hall; the coordinate used in the article is that of the domed structure on the roof of this building.

Astronomical observatories in Ohio
Otterbein University
Buildings and structures in Franklin County, Ohio